Musa Haroon Jama (born September 13, 1986 in Doha), also known as Musa Haroon, is a Qatari footballer. He currently plays as a defender . He is a member of the Qatar national football team.

Goals for Senior National Team

References

External links 
 QSL.com.qa profile 
 
 
 Umm Salal presents new players

1986 births
Living people
Qatari footballers
Qatar international footballers
Al-Arabi SC (Qatar) players
Umm Salal SC players
Al-Shamal SC players
Al-Rayyan SC players
Qatar SC players
Qatar Stars League players
Qatari Second Division players
Association football defenders